This is a list of notable chatbots.

Chatbots are text-based conversation agents that can interact with human users through some medium, such as an instant message service. Some chatbots are designed for specific purposes, while others converse with human users on a wide range of topics.

Classic chatbots

Dr. Sbaitso
ELIZA
PARRY
Racter (or Claude Chatterbot)
Mark V Shaney

General chatbots

Albert One - 1998 and 1999 Loebner winner, by Robby Garner.
A.L.I.C.E. - 2001, 2002, and 2004 Loebner Prize winner developed by Richard Wallace.
Bard – artficial intelligence chatbot
Charlix
ChatGPT - a prototype artificial intelligence chatbot
Cleverbot (winner of the 2010 Mechanical Intelligence Competition)
Eugene Goostman - 2012 Turing 100 winner, by Vladimir Veselov.
Fred - an early chatterbot by Robby Garner.
Jabberwacky
Jeeney AI
Lenny - an audio bot designed to annoy telemarketers
MegaHAL
SimSimi - A popular artificial intelligence conversation program that was created in 2002 by ISMaker.
Spookitalk - A chatterbot used for NPCs in Douglas Adams' Starship Titanic video game.
Ultra Hal - 2007 Loebner Prize winner, by Robert Medeksza.
Verbot

IM chatbots
GooglyMinotaur, specializing in Radiohead, the first bot released by ActiveBuddy (June 2001-March 2002)
SmarterChild, developed by ActiveBuddy and released in June 2001
Infobot, an assistant on IRC channels such as #perl, primarily to help out with answering Frequently Asked Questions (June 1995-today)

See also
Chatbot

References

External links

bn:চ্যাটারবটসমূহের তালিকা